Rita Dolores Walters (née White; August 14, 1930 – February 17, 2020) was an American politician.

Political career
Walters served on the Board of Library Commissioners for the Los Angeles Public Library. Prior to this position, she served on the Los Angeles City Council representing the 9th district from 1991 to 2001. During that time, she chaired the Arts, Health & Humanities Committee where she reviewed matters related to the Library Department. She was the first African-American woman elected to the City Council. Prior to this job, she was on the Los Angeles Unified School District's Board of Education (1979–1991). Walters was also a teacher in the adult division of the Los Angeles School District for four years.

Background
Walters was born in Chicago, Illinois, and moved with her parents and family to Kansas. She moved to Los Angeles in 1955, and there she met and married Wilbur E. Walters. They had three children: David, Susan, and Philip. She died in Los Angeles while in hospice care from Alzheimer's disease.

Education
Walters graduated with a bachelor's degree in education from Shaw University and had an MBA from the UCLA Anderson School of Management.

Recognition
In 2009, Walters was recognized on the popular podcast, 'Vaguely Live Radio', as part of the feature 'Jimmy's Random Wikipedia Page of the Week'.

References

1930 births
2020 deaths
African-American city council members in California
African-American women in politics
California Democrats
Deaths from dementia in California
Deaths from Alzheimer's disease
Los Angeles City Council members
Politicians from Chicago
School board members in California
Shaw University alumni
UCLA Anderson School of Management alumni
Women city councillors in California
21st-century African-American people
21st-century African-American women